The Argentine general election of 1963 was held on 7 July. Voters chose both the President and their legislators; with a turnout of 85.6%, resulting in the election of Arturo Illia as President of Argentina.

Background
The spectre of military intervention so much in evidence after the election of Arturo Frondizi in 1958 became reality following his coerced resignation on March 29, 1962. His UCRI candidates had done well; but the evening's big surprise, Andrés Framini's election as Governor of Buenos Aires Province (one of ten Peronists to win gubernatorial polls that night), proved unacceptable to the armed forces.  An array of political leaders had been lobbying the military against Frondizi, as well: centrist UCRP leader Ricardo Balbín (whom Frondizi defeated on a splinter ticket in 1958) and conservative economist Álvaro Alsogaray (whom Frondizi sidestepped in favor of pro-industry economist Rogelio Julio Frigerio) both openly celebrated the president's unceremonious exit.

The matter of Frondizi's successor, itself, became a subject of contention within the armed forces. The two opposing camps defined themselves as either "Blues" ( Azules, at pains to maintain a patina of legality over the destabilizing intervention) or "Reds" ( Colorados, lacking any compunction against imposing a prolonged and repressive dictatorship).  The stalemate lasted merely a day because most of the Army High Command were "Blues," whose preference of a "legal" solution to the vacuum was supported by most of the press and the Argentine public, then enjoying Latin America's widest access to the media. Relying on constitutional guidelines, they named the reluctant Senate President José María Guido Head of State.

Guido, a moderate senator from then-remote Río Negro Province, had been elected on Frondizi's 's UCRI ticket. His prompt resignation from the UCRI and annulment of the March 18 mid-term elections did not immediately dispel the threat of a coup attempt, however, and mutinies in April and August resulted in the appointment of Army General Juan Carlos Onganía (who successfully rebelled against his "Red" superiors) as Head of the Military Joint Chiefs.  The more stable military panorama was overshadowed by economic worries. Following a brief period of robust growth led by industrial production, President Guido's economic team, led by Alsogaray, imposed a fresh devaluation and austerity measures such as strict credit controls and even the payment of state salaries with nearly-worthless bonds. GDP fell by 4% in 1962-63 and unemployment rose to nearly 9%.

The Radical Civic Union (UCR) was again divided between the Intransigent (UCRI) and more conservative Popular (UCRP) factions as they convened in March 1963.  The UCRP nominated former Córdoba Province Vice-Governor Arturo Illia, a country doctor fondly remembered for his work in the Public Health Committee in Congress; Balbín, who still led the UCRP, opted out of the nomination at the party's March 10 convention believing that a less anti-Peronist choice would give the UCRP a critical advantage over the rival UCRI.

The UCRI, as they had done in 1958, initially hoped to secure the exiled Juan Perón's endorsement who, from Madrid, still directly controlled a fifth of the Argentine electorate. Permitted to field local and Lower House candidates (but still banned from either the Senate or the Presidency) Peronist voters, like in 1962, rallied behind the UP and six other parties. Their intention to run in the less-than-free elections was itself in defiance of Perón, however, who refused to endorse "neo-Peronist" candidates and instead called for blank ballots. Alejandro Leloir, who had fallen out with fellow neo-Peronists as well as Perón, ran for President independently on the Three Flags ticket; named for the "three Peronist flags" of sovereignty, independence, and social justice, this became the only Peronist ticket allowed on the presidential ballot in 1963.

Against opposition from former Buenos Aires Governor Oscar Alende, Frondizi and Perón initially agreed on a "National Popular Front," fielding a respected, moderately conservative publisher as the nominee, Vicente Solano Lima. Tricked by a similar move in 1958, the military objected, however, leading to the brutal 1963 Argentine Navy Revolt on April 2, which cost 24 lives and effectively scuttled the Perón-Frondizi front. These incidents led former President Pedro Aramburu run on his UDELPA ticket, thus hoping to provide those most likely to support a military coup a suitable, center-right choice instead. He was also endorsed by the more moderate Democratic Progressive Party, whose leader, Horacio Thedy, ran as Aramburu's running mate; making fears of Perón's return his battle horse, Aramburu's slogan was unequivocal: Vote UDELPA...and HE won't return!  Other anti-Peronist conservatives supported former Córdoba Mayor Emilio Olmos and the FNPC.

Hamstrung by Frondizi's open enmity against Alende for the latter's rejection of the ultimately aborted Front, as well as Perón's call for blank ballots, Alende's UCRI was defeated in an upset by Dr. Arturo Illia and the UCRP.

The renewed ban on the participation of Peronist candidates resulted in the highest percentage of blank votes in Argentine electoral history; Leloir's Three Flags ticket received 4 electoral votes.

Candidates for President 
Radical Civic Union (centrist): Former Deputy Arturo Umberto Illia of Córdoba
Intransigent Radical Civic Union (center-left): Former Governor Oscar Alende of Buenos Aires
UDELPA (conservative): Former de facto President  Pedro Eugenio Aramburu of Córdoba
National Federation of Center Parties (conservative): Former Córdoba Mayor Emilio Olmos 
Christian Democratic Party (centrist): Former Deputy Horacio Sueldo of Buenos Aires
Socialist Party: Former Senator Alfredo Palacios of Buenos Aires

Results

President

Chamber of Deputies

References

1963
1963 elections in Argentina
1963
July 1963 events in South America